Thyas nubilata is a species of moth of the family Erebidae first described by William Jacob Holland in 1920. It is found in the Democratic Republic of the Congo.

References

Ophiusina